I'm a Celebrity...Get Me Out of Here! returned for its tenth series on 14 November 2010. It ran for 3 weeks. Ant & Dec returned as the presenters for the main show, and its spin off show Get Me out of Here... Now returned, with Caroline Flack and Joe Swash as main presenters. On 4 December 2010, singer Stacey Solomon won the show.

Celebrities
On 10 November, ITV officially confirmed the 10 celebrities taking part. Dom Joly, Gail Porter and Alison Hammond, initially reported to be joining the show, were not on the list, but Joly and Hammond were later reported to be in Australia on standby for a possible late entry to the show. Playboy model Kayla Collins has been added to the list to complete the lineup.

At the beginning of the series the contestants were divided into separate camps, Camp Bruce (males) and Camp Sheila (females).  The contestants entered the jungle either by skydiving into camp or paddling in on canoes.  Those facing a watery entrance had to canoe across a lake before crawling through a damp and dark tunnel. The first five-part trial "Terrovision" rewarded the winners with one last night of luxury and punished the losers with a premature entrance into the jungle.  The first four tasks earned the winning team one point each, the fifth and final task deciding which group makes their way into the bush.

Gillian McKeith became the second contestant in the history of the show to refuse a task (Kerry Katona was the 1st as she refused her trial in series 3) As the contestant for the task is chosen by a public vote using a premium rate phone number, ITV must refund anyone who asks the cost of their telephone vote.

Dom Joly and Jenny Eclair entered the jungle on 18 November, with more celebrities to enter the show later in the series. Alison Hammond was revealed as the 13th contestant to enter the jungle on Day 6 in I'm a Celeb NOW! she arrived in the jungle in a crate, but the others did not know who was inside.

Results and elimination

 Indicates that the celebrity was immune from the vote
 Indicates that the celebrity received the most votes from the public
 Indicates that the celebrity received the fewest votes and was immediately eliminated (no bottom two)
 Indicates that the celebrity was in the bottom two
 Indicates that the celebrity received the second fewest votes and were not named in the bottom two

Notes
 In order to win immunity from the first public vote all the celebrities took part in a task called "Kangaroo Court". The two losers from each round would then go to Jungle Jail (located in camp), in the end the celebrities left in jail at the end of the task would face the first public vote.
 Alison and Kayla were made to do a trial to decide who was eliminated. However, the trial came to a draw and both refused to take part in the final section. To break the tie, the elimination was decided based on the votes, which meant that Alison was eliminated.
 The public were voting for who they wanted to win rather than to save.

The Camps
For the first three days of the show, the group of celebrities were split between two camps: "Camp Bruce" (the boys), and "Camp Sheila" (the girls). The celebrities in each group were:
 Camp Bruce: Aggro, Lembit, Linford, Nigel,  Shaun
 Camp Sheila: Britt, Gillian, Kayla, Sheryl, Stacey

Both camps were supposed to be as good as each other, although there were some differences between the camps. Camp Sheila contained a pink and white recliner, a picture of a shirtless man holding a baby and the beds were pink. Camp Bruce contained a black leather recliner, a picture of a woman scratching her bottom in tennis clothes and the beds were blue, Camp Bruce also was slightly bigger.

On 18 November 2010, the two camps merged. The celebrities in the Camp Sheila moved into the Camp Bruce, as it was bigger.

Bushtucker trials
The contestants take part in daily trials to earn food

 The public voted for who they wanted to face the trial
 The contestants decided who did which trial
 The trial was compulsory and neither the public nor celebrities decided who took part

Notes
 The celebrities were split up into two camps (Camp Bruce for Boys and Camp Sheila for Girls), the winners (the Girls) spent their first night of the show in luxury and the losers (the Boys) spent their first night of the show in a makeshift camp.
 Britt, Gillian and Nigel were excluded from this trial on medical grounds.
 Alison was excluded because she was new to the camp.
 Gillian was allowed to bring someone to help her in this trial; she chose Sheryl.
 Gillian was the second celebrity ever to not attempt a Bushtucker Trial, after Kerry Katona in Season Three
 Gillian was originally selected to do the trial, but she fake-fainted and was unable to start it, she received 56.15% of the vote to do the trial.
 Britt, Gillian and Alison were excluded from this trial on medical grounds.
 Britt was excluded from this trial on medical grounds.
 This trial decided who would leave camp and not how camp would be fed. When the trial ended in a draw with both refusing to face the tie-breaker, the public vote was used to decide.
 This trial previously was meant to be done by Gillian on Day 8, although she refused to take part.
 For the first time ever all celebrities took part in the trial to earn their final meal as a three.
 The final trial was the same trial that Dean Gaffney took part in on Series 6.
 The two remaining celebrities were allowed to choose any meal they wanted from anywhere, although it came with a price, the price was that they would have to take part in the final live trial.
 If Shaun refused to take part in any part of the trial Lembit would be punished and if Stacey refused to take part in any part of the trial Dom would be punished, although Shaun and Stacey did not refuse any part of the trial meaning Dom and Lembit were not punished.

Star count

Ratings 
Official ratings are taken from the Broadcasters' Audience Research Board.

References

External links
 

2010 British television seasons
10